Lars Hanssen (30 August 1903 – 1940) was a Norwegian chess player and chess composer, Norwegian Chess Championship silver medalist (1926, 1932).

Biography
In the 1930s Lars Hanssen was one of the leading Norwegian chess players. He twice won silver medal in the Norwegian Chess Championship: in 1926 and 1932. In 1930, he won minor tournament in Nordic Chess Championship. In 1936, Lars Hanssen with chess club Schakklubben av 1911 won Norwegian Team Chess Championship.

Lars Hanssen played for Norway in the Chess Olympiad:
 In 1931, at second board in the 4th Chess Olympiad in Prague (+2, =3, -11).

Chess composition

His main achievement in chess composition is the victory in the competition of etudes of the magazine Fodor Illustrations-Verlag (1930). Then Hansssen managed to get ahead, in particular, Leonid Kubbel.

Solution:
1. Nd6 (threatens 2. Nc8). 1... Nf4 2. d5 Rg8 3. Ne8 Rxg2+ 4. Kh1, and White win.

References

External links

Lars Hanssen chess games at 365chess.com

1903 births
1940 deaths
Sportspeople from Trondheim
Norwegian chess players
Chess Olympiad competitors
Chess composers
20th-century chess players